Marie-Josée Kravis (née Drouin; born 11 September 1949) is a Canadian businesswoman and philanthropist.

Early life and education
Marie-Josée Drouin was born in Ottawa, Ontario, Canada, of French and English parentage and was the youngest of seven children. She earned an MA in economics from the University of Ottawa. In 1994, she was appointed an Officer of the Order of Canada. In 2006, she received the Légion d'honneur award.

Career
She serves on the international advisory board of the Federal Reserve Bank of New York and on the boards of LVMH, MoMA and Publicis S.A and was involved in a number of Canadian boardrooms throughout the 1980s. From 1971 to 1984 she was a consultant to the Hudson Institute of New York and executive director of the Hudson Institute of Canada.

She has served on the boards of CIBC, the Ford Motor Company, the Standard Life Insurance Co., Hasbro Inc., Hollinger International, Vivendi Universal and IAC/InterActiveCorp. She was a board member at Conrad Black's Hollinger International until late 2003. Black was later charged with fraud and obstruction of justice. Kravis was called as a witness at Black's trial in 2007 and testified that she had been unaware of the corporate malfeasance during her tenure. Additionally, she previously served as vice-chair of Canada's Royal Commission on National Passenger Transportation and co-chaired a national commission on prosperity and competitiveness. She served on the binational dispute settlement panel established under the NAFTA agreement.

Media
She has been a regular columnist for La Presse, the Montreal Gazette and the Financial Post of Canada, and she has contributed to the Wall Street Journal and numerous other publications. She hosted a weekly television show on the public television network TV Ontario. She is also the author with B. Bruce-Briggs of Canada Has a Future and with Maurice Ernst and Jimmy Wheeler of Western Europe: Adjusting to Structural Change.

Philanthropy
Together with her husband, she is ranked the 25th highest donating individual according to The Chronicle of Philanthropy. Their primary focuses have been in arts and culture and medicine. In other fields, she sits on the board of the Institute for Advanced Study in Princeton, New Jersey. She is a senior fellow at the Hudson Institute and a member of the Council on Foreign Relations.

Arts and Culture
Among the cultural organizations they have supported are: Lincoln Center for the Performing Arts and the New York Philharmonic Orchestra, where they established a composer-in-residence program and the Marie-Josée Kravis Prize for New Music, one of the largest new-music prizes. 
At the Museum of Modern Art, whose board she joined in 1994, she served as Board President from July 2005 – 2018 and as of July 2021 she will replace Leon Black as Board Chair.  She is also a supporter of the Metropolitan Opera, the Tate Museum and Somerset House, London. She is a board member of the Qatar Museums Authority and a member of the International Council of the Prado Museum.

Medicine
She chairs the selection committee of The Henry R. Kravis Prize in Nonprofit Leadership, which is awarded for innovations in non-profit work. At the Mount Sinai Medical Center, she serves as a major patron and with her husband has given close to $30 million for heart research. At the Sloan Kettering Institute, she and her husband established a chair in Human Oncology and Pathogenesis in 2006. In 2013 with a gift of $100 million they established a Center for Molecular Oncology at Memorial Sloan Kettering Cancer Center.  She also serves as vice-chair of the Memorial Sloan Kettering Cancer Center and chair of the Sloan Kettering Institute.

Personal life
In the 1970s she was linked to Jean-Pierre Goyer, a minister in the government of Pierre Trudeau. She married Montreal Symphony conductor Charles Dutoit in 1982; they subsequently divorced.
In 1994, she became the third wife of billionaire financier Henry Kravis. The Kravises have homes in New York City; Southampton, New York; Meeker, Colorado; Palm Beach, Florida; and Paris, France. Their principal residence is a Park Avenue triplex.

References

1949 births
Living people
People from Montreal
People from Ottawa
University of Ottawa alumni
Canadian economists
Canadian women economists
Directors of LVMH
Members of the Steering Committee of the Bilderberg Group
People associated with the Museum of Modern Art (New York City)
Officers of the Order of Canada
Hudson Institute